Ontang is a type of raft of the Sama-Bajau people of the Philippines. A platform made split bamboo is built on top of the booms. Ontang can be used for fishing, but they can also hold lanterns during night-time fishing. They are typically towed behind Sama-Bajau houseboats during travel, with the towing line commonly strung with baited fish hooks.

See also
 Junkun
 Owong
 Vinta
 Djenging
 Garay (ship)
 Balangay

References 

Indigenous ships of the Philippines